Liberato Gianpaolo Cacace (born 27 September 2000) is a New Zealand professional footballer who plays as a left-back for  club Empoli and the New Zealand national team.

Club career

Island Bay
As a youth, Cacace played for Island Bay United and was also a representative player of Capital Football for two years in their 1999 squad. He was chosen by former Wellington Phoenix and All Whites coach Ricki Herbert to be part of his junior elite academy.

Cacace also played for his school team at St Patrick's College in Wellington, alongside South Sudan international Manyumow Achol. Cacace helped his college team win the Wellington Premier Youth football league, scoring in the 2–1 final against Hutt International Boys' School.

Wellington Phoenix Reserves
Cacace started playing for the Wellington Phoenix Reserves in the New Zealand Football Championship in the 2016–17 season, making eight appearances, including four starts.

During the winter season, Cacace played with Wellington Phoenix feeder club Wellington United in the local Central League.

Wellington Phoenix
On 2 February 2018, Cacace made his debut for the senior side, coming on as a substitute in a 4–0 defeat against Sydney FC in the A-League. Following the end of the 2017–18 A-League season, and having made seven appearances for the club, Cacace signed a three-year professional contract with Wellington Phoenix.

In the 2018–19 season, following the departure of Scott Galloway and injury to Tom Doyle, Cacace became the first-choice left-back under new manager Mark Rudan, one month after his 18th birthday. Cacace scored his maiden A-League goal against Central Coast Mariners in an 8-2 victory on 9 March 2019, becoming the club's youngest ever goalscorer at 18 years and 163 days. After playing more minutes than any other Wellington Phoenix player that season, Cacace won the club's Young Player of the Year award ahead of fellow starter Sarpreet Singh.

The following season, Cacace established himself as one of Wellington's most important players, with captain Steven Taylor calling him "the best left-back in the league without a shadow of a doubt". On 8 March 2020, Cacace played his 50th game for Wellington Phoenix against Central Coast Mariners, the youngest player in the club's history to do so.

Sint-Truiden
After a stellar season with the Wellington Phoenix, Cacace signed a three year contract with Sint-Truiden for a suspected transfer fee of around €1.2 million.

Empoli
On 31 January 2022, Cacace joined Italian Serie A club Empoli on loan, with a conditional obligation to buy. The conditions were fulfilled and Empoli purchased the rights on 17 June 2022.

International career
Cacace was part of the New Zealand U-17 team that won the 2017 OFC U-17 Championship, where he scored one goal. This meant that the team qualified for the 2017 FIFA U-17 World Cup in India. Cacace then played at the FIFA U-17 World Cup, making his World Cup debut in the 1–1 draw with Turkey, before starting again in a 4–2 loss to Paraguay and a 3–1 loss to Mali.

Cacace was selected to join the All Whites squad in the 2018 Intercontinental Cup in June 2018. He made his All Whites debut in Mumbai on 5 June 2018, against Chinese Taipei, in a 1–0 victory.

Cacace scored the opening goal at the 2020 Summer Olympics in New Zealand's 3–2 loss to Honduras.

Cacace scored against Tahiti in a 1–0 win in the semi-finals of the OFC FIFA World Cup qualifiers.

Personal life
Cacace was born in Wellington to an Italian father and a New Zealand mother of Italian descent. His father Antonio arrived in the country in 1992 from Massa Lubrense, a small commune in Naples, and operates La Bella Italia, an Italian restaurant located in Petone. He attended St Patrick's College.

Cacace supports his father's hometown team, Napoli.

Career statistics

Club

International 

Scores and results list New Zealand's goal tally first, score column indicates score after each Cacace goal.

Honours 
New Zealand U17
 OFC U-17 Championship: 2017

Individual
 Wellington Phoenix U-23 Player of the Year: 2018–19
 PFA Team of the Season: 2019–20
 Harry Kewell Medal: 2019–20

References

External links

2000 births
Living people
New Zealand people of Italian descent
Association footballers from Wellington City
New Zealand association footballers
Association football defenders
People educated at St. Patrick's College, Wellington
Wellington Phoenix FC players
Sint-Truidense V.V. players
Empoli F.C. players
New Zealand Football Championship players
A-League Men players
Belgian Pro League players
Serie A players
New Zealand youth international footballers
New Zealand under-20 international footballers
New Zealand under-23 international footballers
Olympic association footballers of New Zealand
New Zealand international footballers
Footballers at the 2020 Summer Olympics
New Zealand expatriate association footballers
New Zealand expatriate sportspeople in Belgium
Expatriate footballers in Belgium
New Zealand expatriate sportspeople in Italy
Expatriate footballers in Italy